Wear OS (also known simply as Wear and formerly Android Wear) is a version of Google's Android operating system designed for smartwatches and other wearables. By pairing with mobile phones running Android version 6.0 "Marshmallow" or newer, or iOS version 10.0 or newer with limited support from Google's pairing application, Wear OS integrates Google Assistant technology and mobile notifications into a smartwatch form factor.

Wear OS supports Bluetooth, NFC, Wi-Fi, 3G, and LTE connectivity, as well as a range of features and applications. Watch face styles include round, square and rectangular. Hardware manufacturing partners include Asus, Broadcom, Fossil, HTC, Intel, LG, MediaTek, Imagination Technologies, Motorola, New Balance, Qualcomm, Samsung, Huawei, Skagen, Polar, TAG Heuer, Suunto, and Mobvoi.

In the first six months of availability, Canalys estimates that over 720,000 Android Wear smartwatches were shipped. , Wear OS had between 10 and 50 million application installations. Wear OS was estimated to account for 10% of the smartwatch market in 2015.

History and compatibility 

The platform was announced on March 18, 2014, along with the release of a developer preview. At the same time, companies such as Motorola, Samsung, LG, HTC and Asus were announced as partners. On June 25, 2014, at Google I/O, the Samsung Gear Live and LG G Watch were launched, along with further details about Android Wear. The LG G Watch is the first Android Wear smartwatch to be released and shipped.
Motorola's Moto 360 was released on September 5, 2014.

On December 10, 2014, an update started to roll out, adding new features including a watch face API and changed the software to be based on Android 5.0 "Lollipop".

The LG G Watch and Samsung Gear Live started shipping in July 2014, while the Motorola Moto 360, began shipping in September 2014.

On August 31, 2015, Google launched a Wear OS app for IOS version 8.2 or newer, allowing limited support for receiving iOS notifications on smartwatches running Wear OS. , only the LG Watch Urbane and Huawei Watch are supported, but Google announced support for more smartwatch models.

In March 2018, Android Wear was rebranded as Wear OS. It was stated that the renaming "better reflects our technology, vision, and most important of all — the people who wear our watches." In September 2018, Google announced Wear OS 2.0, which made the personalized Google feed (replacing Google Now) and new fitness tracking platform Google Fit accessible from the watch face, and redesigned the notification area to use a scrolling pane rather than pages, and support automatically generated smart replies (as on Android Pie). In November 2018, the underlying platform of Wear OS was upgraded to a version of Android Pie.

In January 2021, Google completed its acquisition of wearables manufacturer Fitbit; upon its announcement of the purchase in November 2019, Google's head of hardware Rick Osterloh stated that it would be "an opportunity to invest even more in Wear OS as well as introduce Made by Google wearable devices into the market."

In May 2021 at Google I/O, Google announced a major update to the platform, internally known as Wear OS 3.0. It incorporates a new visual design inspired by Android 12, and Fitbit exercise tracking features. Google also announced a partnership with Samsung Electronics, who is collaborating with Google to unify its Tizen-based smartwatch platform with Wear OS, and has committed to using Wear OS on its future smartwatch products. The underlying codebase was also upgraded to Android 11. Wear OS 3.0 will be available to Wear OS devices running Qualcomm Snapdragon Wear 4100 system on chip, and will be an opt-in upgrade requiring a factory reset to install.

Features 
Wear OS can synchronize notifications from a paired device, and supports voice control with the "OK Google" hotword along with gesture-based input. Wear OS integrates with Google services such as the Google Assistant and Google Mobile Services (including Gmail, Google Maps, and Google Wallet), as well as third-party watch apps from Play Store. From the watch face, the user can swipe up to access their notifications, down to access a quick settings panel, from the left to view their personalized Google feed, and the right to view Google Fit. Via Google Fit and similar applications, Wear OS supports ride and run tracking, and devices containing heart rate sensors can perform a reading on-demand, or at intervals throughout the day. The watch can control media being played on streamed on paired devices.

Version history

Android Wear

Wear OS

See also 

 List of Wear OS devices
 Android
 Android Auto
 Android TV
 AsteroidOS
 watchOS
 Google Glass

References

External links

 
 

Wear
Google operating systems
Google services
IOS software
Products introduced in 2014
Smartwatches
Wearable computers